The 1978 Virginia Slims of Houston  was a women's tennis tournament played on indoor carpet courts at the Astro Arena  in Houston, Texas in the United States that was part of the 1978 Virginia Slims World Championship Series. It was the eighth edition of the tournament and was held from January 16 through January 22, 1978. First-seeded Martina Navratilova won the singles title and earned $20,000 first-prize money. The doubles event was sponsored as the Bridgestone Doubles of Houston.

Finals

Singles
 Martina Navratilova defeated  Billie Jean King 1–6, 6–2, 6–2

Doubles
 Billie Jean King /  Martina Navratilova defeated  Mona Guerrant /  Greer Stevens 7–6(5–4), 4–6, 7–6(5–4)

Prize money

References

External links
 Women's Tennis Association (WTA) tournament details

Virginia Slims of Hosuton
Virginia Slims of Houston
Virginia Slims of Houston
Virginia Slims of Houston
Virginia Slims of Houston
Virginia Slims of Houston